The Piedmont League was a minor league baseball league that operated from 1920 through 1955.  The league operated principally in the Piedmont plateau region in the eastern United States.

Teams
The following teams were members of the Piedmont League (in alphabetical order):
Asheville, NC: Asheville Tourists – 1931–1932 (formerly of the South Atlantic League, 1924–1930); 1934–1942
Charlotte, NC:  Charlotte Hornets – 1931–1935 (formerly of the South Atlantic League, 1919–1930); 1937–1942 (moved to the Tri-State League, 1946–1953, the South Atlantic League, 1954–1963, and the Southern League, 1964–1971)
Colonial Heights, VA & Petersburg, VA: Colonial Heights-Petersburg Colts – 1954
Columbia, SC: Columbia Sandlappers – 1934
Danville, VA: Danville Tobacconists – 1920–1924; Danville Leafs – 1925–1926
Durham, NC: Durham Bulls – 1920–33; 1936–1943
Greensboro, NC: Greensboro Patriots – 1920–1926; 1928–1934; Greensboro Red Sox – 1941–1942
Hagerstown, MD: Hagerstown Braves – 1953 (formerly of the Interstate League, 1950–1952); Hagerstown Packets – 1954–55
Henderson, NC: Henderson Bunnies – 1929; Henderson Gamecocks – 1930–1931
High Point, NC: High Point Furniture Makers – 1920–22; High Point Pointers – 1923–1932
Lancaster, PA: Lancaster Red Roses – 1954–1955
Lynchburg, VA: Lynchburg Cardinals – 1943–1955
Newport News, VA: Newport News Dodgers – 1944–1955
Norfolk, VA:Norfolk Tars – 1934–1955
Portsmouth, VA: Portsmouth Truckers – 1935; Portsmouth Cubs – 1936–1952; Portsmouth Merrimacs – 1953–1955
Raleigh, NC: Raleigh Nats – 1920; Raleigh Red Birds – 1921; Raleigh Capitals – 1922–1928; 1930–1932
Richmond, VA: Richmond Colts – 1933–1953
Roanoke, VA:  Roanoke Red Sox – 1943–1950; Roanoke Ro-Sox – 1951–1953
Rocky Mount, NC:Rocky Mount Buccaneers – 1927 (moved to the Eastern Carolina League, 1928–1929); Rocky Mount Red Sox – 1936–1940
Salisbury, NC & Spencer, NC: Salisbury Colonials – 1925; Salisbury-Spencer Colonials – 1926–1929
Sunbury, PA: Sunbury Redlegs – 1955
Wilmington, NC: Wilmington Pirates – 1932–1935
Winston-Salem, NC: Winston-Salem Twins – 1920–1933; 1937–1942
York, PA: York White Roses – 1953–1955 (formerly of the Interstate League, 1943–1952)

Standings & statistics

Years 1920 to 1955

1920 Piedmont League

Playoff: Greensboro 4 games, Raleigh 3

1921 Piedmont League

Playoff: Greensboro 4 games, High Point 1

1922 Piedmont League

Playoff: Durham 4 games, High Point 3, one tie

1923 Piedmont League

Playoff: Danville 4 games, Greensboro 0

1924 Piedmont League

1925 Piedmont League

High Point (18-32) moved to Danville June 18. Playoff: Durham 4 games, Winston-Salem 3

1926 Piedmont League

Danville (11-10) moved to High Point May 12. Playoff: Greensboro 4 games, Durham 1

1927 Piedmont League

Playoff: Salibury-Spencer 3 games, Raleigh 2

1928 Piedmont League

Playoff: Winston-Salem 4 games, High Point 3

1929 Piedmont League

Playoff: Greensboro 4 games, Durham 1

1930 Piedmont League

Playoff: Durham 4 games, Henderson 3

1931 Piedmont League

Playoff: Charlotte 4 games, Raleigh 2

1932 Piedmont League

Asheville and High Point disbanded July 7; Winston-Salem moved to High Point August 20Playoff: Greensboro 4 games, Charlotte 3

1933 Piedmont League

1934 Piedmont League

Playoff: Norfolk 4 games, Charlotte 2

1935 Piedmont League

Playoff: Richmond 4 games, Asheville 2

1936 Piedmont League

Playoffs: Norfolk 3 games, Richmond 0;  Durham 3 games, Rocky Mount 1Finals: Norfolk 3 games Durham 0

1937 Piedmont League

Playoffs: Norfolk 3 games, Richmond 1; Portsmouth 3 games, Asheville 2
Finals
 Norfolk 3 games, Portsmouth 0

1938 Piedmont League

Playoffs: Charlotte 3 games, Portsmouth 2; Rocky Mount 3 games, Norfolk 1Finals: Charlotte 4 games, Rocky Mount 3

1939 Piedmont League

Playoffs: Asheville 3 games, Richmond 0; Rocky Mount 3 games, Durham 1Finals: Asheville 4 games, Rocky Mount 2

1940 Piedmont League

Playoffs: Rocky Mount 4 games, Asheville 2; Durham 4 games, Richmond 3Finals: Durham 4 games, Rocky Mount 2

1941 Piedmont League

Playoffs: Greensboro 4 games, Portsmouth 0; Durham 4 games, Norfolk 1Finals: Durham 4 games, Greensboro 0

1942 Piedmont League

Playoffs: Greensboro 4 games, Charlotte 0; Portsmouth 4 games, Richmond 3Finals: Greensboro 4 games, Portsmouth 2

1943 Piedmont League

Playoffs: Portsmouth 4 games, Roanoke 1; Norfolk 4 games, Richmond 0Finals: Norfolk 4 games, Portsmouth 2

1944 Piedmont League

Playoffs: Portsmouth 4 games, Norfolk 3; Lynchburg 4 games, Richmond 2, one tieFinals: Lynchburg 4 games, Portsmouth 3

1945 Piedmont League

Playoffs: Portsmouth 4 games. Norfolk 3; Richmond 4 games, Newport News 0Finals: Portsmouth 4 games, Richmond 0

1946 Piedmont League

Playoffs: Newport News 4 games, Portsmouth 0; Roanoke 4 games, Norfolk 2Finals: Newport News 4 games, Roanoke 2, one tie.

1947 Piedmont League

Playoffs: Roanoke 4 games, Richmond 1; Norfolk 4 games, Portsmouth 0Finals: Roanoke 4 games, Norfolk 3

1948 Piedmont League

Playoffs: Lynchburg 4 games, Roanoke 3; Newport News 4 games, Portsmouth 3Finals: Newport News 4 games, Lynchburg 0

1949 Piedmont League

Playoffs: Lynchburg 4 games, Roanoke 3; Portsmouth 4 games, Richmond 2Finals: Lynchburg 4 games, Portsmouth 2

1950 Piedmont League

Playoffs: Portsmouth 4 games, Richmond 0; Roanoke 4 games, Lynchburg 1Finals: Roanoke 4 games, Portsmouth 3

1951 Piedmont League

Playoffs: Norfolk 4 games, Portsmouth 1; Richmond 4 games, Newport News 2Finals: Norfolk 4 games, Richmond 2

1952 Piedmont League

Playoffs: Richmond 4 games, Norfolk 1; : Portsmouth 4 games, Lynchburg 2Finals: Richmond 4 games, Portsmouth 2

1953 Piedmont League

Roanoke withdrew July 24.Playoffs: Norfolk 4 games, Portsmouth 1.;: Newport News 4 games, Hagerstown <Finals: Norfolk 4 games, Newport News 1.

1954 Piedmont League

Playoffs: Portsmouth 4 games, Norfolk 2; Newport News 4 games, York 0.Finals: Newport News 4 games, Portsmouth 3

1955 Piedmont League

Norfolk withdrew July 14Playoffs: Portsmouth 3 games, Newport News 1; Lancaster 3 games, York 1Finals Lancaster 3 games, Portsmouth 2.

Champions 
The following teams were champions of the Piedmont League:

Hall of Fame alumni

Yogi Berra (1943, Norfolk)
Whitey Ford (1948, Norfolk)
Jimmie Foxx (1944, Portsmouth, MGR)
Hank Greenberg (1930, Raleigh)
Whitey Herzog (1951, Norfolk)
Tony Lazzeri (1942, (Portsmouth, MGR)
 Buck Leonard (1953, Portsmouth)
Heinie Manush (1940, Rocky Mount; 1941-1942, Greensboro; 1943, Roanoke)
Johnny Mize (1930-1931, 1933, Greensboro)
Phil Rizzuto (1938, Norfolk)
Brooks Robinson (1955, York)
Red Schoendienst (1943, Lynchburg)
Duke Snider (1944-1945, Newport News)
Billy Southworth (1935-1936, Asheville, MGR)
Early Wynn (1938-1940, Charlotte)

References 
 McCann, M. (n.d.). Minor League Baseball History. Retrieved April 27, 2007, from https://www.webcitation.org/query?url=http://www.geocities.com/big_bunko/piedmont2055.htm&date=2009-10-25+13:33:55

Defunct minor baseball leagues in the United States
Defunct professional sports leagues in the United States
Baseball leagues in North Carolina
Baseball leagues in Virginia
Baseball leagues in South Carolina
Baseball leagues in Pennsylvania
Baseball leagues in Maryland
Sports leagues established in 1920
Sports leagues established in 1955